Opsariichthys uncirostris is a species of cyprinid in the genus Opsariichthys. It inhabits Siberia, China, Korea and Japan.

References

Cyprinid fish of Asia
Fish of Russia
Fish of China
Fish of Japan
Taxa named by Coenraad Jacob Temminck
Taxa named by Hermann Schlegel
Fish described in 1846